Fang Binxing is a former Principal of Beijing University of Posts and Telecommunications. He is also known for his substantial contribution to China's Internet censorship infrastructure, and has been dubbed "Father of China's Great Fire Wall".

Biography
Fang was born on 17 July 1960 in Harbin, Heilongjiang province. Fang went to university at Harbin Institute of Technology, where he earned a PhD in computer science and became a lecturer. He began working at the National Computer Network Emergency Response Technical Team / Coordination Center of China in 1999 as deputy chief engineer; from 2000 he was chief engineer and director. It was in this position that he oversaw the development of the filtering and blocking technology that has become known as the Great Firewall, and thus, he has been dubbed "Father of China's Great Fire Wall".

Fang has defended the Great Firewall in the media, stating that it is a "natural reaction to something newborn and unknown" and that web censoring is a "common phenomenon around the world". Appearing on China Central Television in March 2010, Fang accused Google of conducting censorship such as Chilling Effects.

Fang has helped create a major electronic surveillance operation in Chongqing for party secretary Bo Xilai. The system involved wiretaps, eavesdropping, and monitoring of internet communications.

Incidents

2011 shoe throwing incident
On 19 May 2011, Fang was hit on the chest by a shoe thrown at him by a Huazhong University of Science and Technology student who calls himself "Hanjunyi" while Fang was giving a lecture at Wuhan University. According to RFI, the student discussed the planned shoe attack on Twitter, and with the help of other bloggers, was able to locate the exact whereabouts and the time of Fang's lecture. After the shoe throwing incident, "Hanjunyi" was able to walk out while other students were trying to obstruct school teachers who were going to detain him. "Hanjunyi" had since become an instant internet hero of the Chinese blogosphere, with bloggers offering him a large number of presents, such as cash, airline tickets, buffet dinners at Hong Kong five-star hotels, tours of various sex parlors, sight-seeing tours, a virtual private network, iPad2, admission ticket to Hong Kong Disneyland, escorted tour of Singapore, free hotel rooms, free sex with admiring female bloggers, free shoes and designer clothes. An anonymous blogger even promised him a position in his company if ever "Hanjunyi" is in trouble with the authorities.

During an interview with CNN, "Hanjunyi" said: "I'm not happy about what he (Fang) does. His work made me spend unnecessary money to get access to the website that is supposed to be free... He makes my online surfing very inconvenient."

2016 VPN incident
In April 2016, reports of a botched presentation by Fang went viral. Fang was speaking at his alma mater, the Harbin Institute of Technology, and reportedly planned to display some South Korean web sites as part of the presentation. After his initial attempts were blocked by the Great Firewall, Fang publicly attempted, with mixed success, to bypass the firewall with a VPN. The question-and-answer session following the presentation was cancelled. According to Ming Pao, Fang was later resoundingly mocked online.

References

External links

 News about Fang Binxing on China Digital Times
 Father of Great Firewall forced to remove microblog

Living people
1960 births
Chinese Internet celebrities
Tsinghua University alumni
Members of the Chinese Academy of Engineering
Chinese computer scientists
Delegates to the 11th National People's Congress
Politicians from Harbin
Harbin Institute of Technology alumni
Educators from Heilongjiang
Academic staff of Harbin Institute of Technology
Academic staff of Beijing University of Posts and Telecommunications
Presidents of Beijing University of Posts and Telecommunications
Chinese Communist Party politicians from Heilongjiang
People's Republic of China politicians from Heilongjiang
Scientists from Harbin